Omar Asghar Khan (3 July 1953 – 25 June 2002) was a Pakistani economist, social, political scientist. A professor of Philosophy, Politics and Economics at the Quaid-i-Azam University, he was the founder of Qaumi Jamhoori Party (National Democratic Party).

Early life
Omar excelled in sports in these institutions; "In his school days he was well-known for his exceptional sporting talents. He captained the school's swimming & hockey."

Political activism 

According to Professor Pervez Hoodbhoy:

Work as Federal Minister under General Musharraf's interim government 
His works benefited him when Omar joined General Pervaz Musharraf's cabinet as Federal Minister for Environment, Local Government & Rural Development, Labor, Manpower, and Overseas Pakistanis after a bloodless coup in October 1999. According to some circles, the local body's plan was the brainchild of Omar Asghar Khan, who as minister, did the spadework. In his earlier days, he was very close to labour leaders and organisations. His policies in the environmental field went a long way in protecting the environment.

In December 2001, he resigned from the cabinet and launched a new political party, the Qaumi Jamhoori Party, to contest the general elections, but he died on 25 June 2002, before the elections.

Death 
Omar died at the age of 48, (just a week before his 49th birthday). He was found hanging from a ceiling fan at his in-laws' residence in Karachi. Khan's family continues to insist he was murdered, though the authorities still label his death as "not determined".

References

External links
 Sungi Home Page
 Battling Against the Power Elite – Omar Asghar Khan, Green Pioneers, un.org.pk
 Profile, Omar Asghar Khan Development Foundation, www.oakdf.org.pk
 Memoriam, Newsline, July 2002, www.newsline.com.pk
 Omar Asghar Khan, the man with a vision, Dawn.com, 26 June 2002
 Kashmir in conflict: India, Pakistan and the unending war, Victoria Schofield, books.google.com
 A twist to the Gilgit Rebellion, 16 February 2006, osmaniac.blogspot.com

1953 births
2002 deaths
Pakistani politicians
Pakistani economists
Alumni of the University of Essex
Pakistani social scientists
People from Abbottabad
Politicians who committed suicide
Alumni of the University of Cambridge
Pakistan Army officers
Academic staff of Quaid-i-Azam University
Academic staff of the University of the Punjab